Salvia sordida is a rare perennial shrub endemic to a very small area in Colombia, along an old road from Bogota to La Caro, growing at  elevation in scrub next to streams.

The inflorescence has short, dense, terminal racemes, with a  purple corolla. Flowers also grow in the axils of the upper leaves. It is the most threatened of all Colombia species in the family Labiatae.

Notes

sordida
Flora of Colombia
Plants described in 1846